Lemar is a given name. Notable people with the name include:
Lemar Obika, British R&B singer
Lemar Parrish (born 1947), American former footballer
Lemar Marshall (born 1976), American footballer

See also
Lemar (surname)
Mark Lamarr, a British comedian